Piotr Klimczak (born 18 January 1980, in Nowy Sącz) is a Polish former sprinter who specialized in the 400 metres. He represented his country in the 4 × 400 metres relay at two consecutive Summer Olympics, starting in 2004. His biggest success in the relay is the silver medal at the 2006 World Indoor Championships and individually the silver at the 2007 Summer Universiade.

He played football before switching to athletics in 2002. He retired in 2013.

Achievements

Personal bests
200 metres - 21.06 s (2006)
400 metres - 45.60 s (2005)

References
Sources

Citations

1980 births
Living people
Polish male sprinters
Athletes (track and field) at the 2004 Summer Olympics
Athletes (track and field) at the 2008 Summer Olympics
Olympic athletes of Poland
Sportspeople from Nowy Sącz
Universiade medalists in athletics (track and field)
Universiade gold medalists for Poland
Universiade silver medalists for Poland
World Athletics Indoor Championships medalists
Medalists at the 2005 Summer Universiade
Medalists at the 2007 Summer Universiade